Statesboro High School is a public high school located in the city of Statesboro, Georgia, United States. It was founded in 1904.

Its current principal is Dewayne Collins.

The school completed construction on a new $4.2 million state-of-the-art building in 2009, and the new football stadium, Womack Field, was completed in the fall of 2007.

History

Statesboro High was founded in 1901 with the original school house, a wooden structure, being built on Grady Street in Statesboro. The second Statesboro High School building, a brick structure, was built alongside the original in 1922. The original wooden building was still used until the late 1960s, when both buildings were destroyed by a fire.

The original part of the current building on Lester Road was completed in the summer of 1964. Renovations and additions to the building have continued over the years. The first class graduated from the new Statesboro High School in June 1965.

The current $4.2 million building began construction in 2007 and was completed in 2009. The first class graduated from the new building in May 2009.

Odyssey of the Mind
Statesboro High's Odyssey of the Mind problem one team finished in second place at the 2011 World Finals, and finished second again at the 2012 World Finals.

Athletics
Statesboro High School is well known for its athletics. Statesboro High School is  currently part of the Georgia High School Association AAAAAA athletic division.  Its varsity teams include football, women's and men's basketball, women's and men's track and field, women's and men's cross country, baseball, women's and men's soccer, women's and men's tennis, women's and men's swimming, competitive cheerleading, women's and men's golf, softball, women's volleyball, and wrestling.

State Titles
Boys' Basketball (2) - 1968(A), 1991(4A)
Football (5) - 1956(A), 1957(A), 1966(A), 2001(4A), 2005(4A)
Boys' Golf (1) - 1957(A)
Boys' Track (1) - 1961(A)

Notable alumni

 Joey Hamilton  (class of 1988), former professional baseball player (San Diego Padres, Toronto Blue Jays, Cincinnati Reds)
 Justin Houston (class of 2007), defensive end for the University of Georgia (2007-2010) and current linebacker for the Baltimore Ravens
 Bubba Lewis (class of 2007), actor, star of the MTV series The Inbetweeners
 Jeremy Mincey (class of 2002), defensive lineman for University of Florida and defensive lineman for the Denver Broncos
 DeAngelo Tyson (class of 2008), defensive lineman for the University of Georgia (2008–2011) and former defensive lineman for the Baltimore Ravens

References

External links
 Statesboro High School
 Statesboro High School Bands
 East Georgia Marching Band Festival & Competition 
 Statesboro High School historical marker

Public high schools in Georgia (U.S. state)
Educational institutions established in 1901
Schools in Bulloch County, Georgia
1901 establishments in Georgia (U.S. state)